Mount George may refer to:

 Mount George (Antarctica), one of the Scott Mountains
 Mount George, South Australia, a locality north of Bridgewater in the Adelaide Hills Council
 Mount George Conservation Park, a protected area in Mount George, South Australia
 Mount George, New South Wales, a town in the City of Greater Taree
 Mount George (West Coast), on the South Island

See also
George Mount (born 1955), American Olympic and professional cyclist